Paarlahti is a bay or inlet of the lake of Näsijärvi in the former Teisko municipality (now part of Tampere). Paarlahti is about 10 km long and has a maximum depth of about 60 m.

Paarlahti has been fancifully called the longest inland fjord of Scandinavia (though Finland is not part of Scandinavia, rather it is a Nordic Country), although it does not really resemble the large fjords of Norway. With its long and narrow shape, its depth and its steep shores it is seen as a fjord by non-geologists. Usually there are no islands in a fjord, but Paarlahti has a few. In Lake Inari in Finnish Lapland however, there are several bays that carry the word vuono (the Finnish word for fjord) in their names.

References 

Bays of Finland
Tampere
Landforms of Pirkanmaa